James Aloysius Joseph Patrick Gabriel Wray (28 April 1935 – 25 May 2013) was a Scottish politician and Labour Member of Parliament for Glasgow Baillieston and Glasgow Provan.

Born and raised in the Gorbals, he was one of eight children born in an economically disadvantaged Roman Catholic family. A boxer in his younger days, he was elected as a councillor to the then Glasgow Town Council in 1964 for Kelvinside, and moved over to the larger Strathclyde Regional Council in 1975 for Gorbals. He successfully blocked implementation of fluoridation in court by arguing it violated the 1946 Water Act and the 1968 Medicine Act.

By the time he became an MP, Wray was a wealthy man. He was on the left-wing of the Labour Party, and joined the Campaign Group. His political stances were Eurosceptic, an advocate of Irish republicanism regarding Northern Ireland, and opposed to abortion and the abolition of Section 28. His views on Northern Ireland led him to be tagged "I.R. Wray" by Private Eye. In 2002, he attacked the Scottish Parliament, labeling its members "odds and sods".

Wray stood down as an MP, aged 70, at the 2005 general election following a stroke in December 2003.

Death
Wray died on 25 May 2013 in Mearnskirk Home Hospital in Renfrewshire after suffering from bowel cancer, aged 78. He had four children, two girls and two boys.

References

External links

1935 births
2013 deaths
Deaths from cancer in Scotland
Baillieston
People from Gorbals
Councillors in Glasgow
Scottish Labour councillors
European democratic socialists
Scottish Labour MPs
Members of the Parliament of the United Kingdom for Glasgow constituencies
Transport and General Workers' Union-sponsored MPs
UK MPs 1987–1992
UK MPs 1992–1997
UK MPs 1997–2001
UK MPs 2001–2005
Scottish people of Irish descent
Scottish Roman Catholics